Jack Shanahan (born 3 August 1999) is an Irish professional drift driver from Cork. Shanahan was the 2016 and 2017 champion of the British Drift Championship and also won the Russian Drift Series in 2021.

Career
Shanahan began competing in the semi pro class of the Irish Drift Championship at the age of 13, in a Nissan 180SX, and competed in select rounds of the Drift Allstars European series. In 2014 he won his first major event,  the British Drift Championship event at Lydden Hill in a new car, a BMW-powered Nissan 200SX, and finished third at the Drift Allstars event at Mantorp Park in Sweden.

His 2015 BDC title triumph at the age of sixteen made him the youngest driver to win a major drifting title.

Family

His younger brother, Conor Shanahan, is also a drifter and competed in the Pro class of the British Drift Championship in 2017 after graduating from the Pro-Am class in 2016. In the 2016 season, the brothers shared the same car, a Nissan 180SX.  In 2017 Conor Shanahan appeared on The Grand Tour television series.

References

Drifting drivers
Irish racing drivers
Living people
1999 births